Shazand County is in Markazi province, Iran. The capital of the county is the city of Shazand. At the 2006 census, the county's population was 118,789 in 31,228 households. The following census in 2011 counted 117,746 people in 35,084 households. At the 2016 census, the county's population was 117,571 in 38,214 households.

Administrative divisions

The population history and structural changes of Shazand County's administrative divisions over three consecutive censuses are shown in the following table. The latest census shows four districts, nine rural districts, and six cities.

References

 
Counties of Markazi Province